"Mary Jane (All Night Long)" is a song by American singer-songwriter Mary J. Blige. It was written by Blige, Chucky Thompson and Sean "Puffy" Combs for her second studio album, My Life (1994), while production was helmed by Combs and Thompson. The song is built around a sample of “All Night Long” (1983) by American girl group Mary Jane Girls and "Close the Door" (1978) by American singer Teddy Pendergrass.  Due to the inclusion of the sample, Rick James is also credited as songwriter.

Released as the album's third single, "Mary Jane (All Night Long)" peaked at number 37 on the US Hot R&B/Hip-Hop Airplay chart and became a top twenty single on the UK Singles Chart, where it reached number 17. The official remix for "Mary Jane (All Night Long)" features rapper LL Cool J. The remix version was later included on Blige's compilation HERStory, Vol. 1 (2019) and My Life — 25th Anniversary Edition (2020). A music video for the song was never made.

Critical reception
Larry Flick from Billboard complimented the song as "another pearl" from the queen of hip-hop soul's "current masterpiece", My Life. He remarked that "this sexy homage to the Mary Janes Girls' evergreen "All Night Long" demands immediate turntable attention. [...] If there is a realistic candidate to be the Gladys Knight or Billie Holiday for our generation, Blige is it. No voice is as brutally honest or evocative." Chuck Campbell from Knoxville News Sentinel noted the "controlled vocals and less-is-more music" of "Mary Jane (All Night Long)". A reviewer from Music Week gave the song five out of five, calling it an "sassy reworking", writing, "With Sean 'Puffy' Combs and Bottom Dollar on remix duty, this is one classy track." James Hamilton from the RM Dance Update deemed it an "excellent slower but similar remake". Jonathan Bernstein from Spin noted that Blige "kickstarts" the record with the "thumping lilt" of the Mary Jane Girls song, "presented as her own composition."

Track listings

Credits and personnel 
Credits adapted from the My Life liner notes.
Mary J. Blige – vocals
Rich Travali - recording engineer 
Tony Maserati - audio mixing 
Chucky Thompson – additional instruments

Charts

References

1995 singles
Mary J. Blige songs
Songs written by Rick James
Songs written by Sean Combs
Songs written by Leon Huff
Songs written by Kenny Gamble
1994 songs
Uptown Records singles
Songs written by Chucky Thompson
Songs written by Mary J. Blige